Nancy "Nan" Witcomb is best known around the world for her simple poems published over 3 decades as "The Thoughts of Nanushka". In her home town of Adelaide, South Australia, she is also known as a broadcaster and raconteur and has made appearances on national television.

Biography
Trained as a nurse at the Adelaide Children's Hospital, Nan joined Australian National Airlines (later Ansett Australia) as a hostess in 1950, launching a 23-year career that she later documented in her memoir of the early days of hostessing "Up Here and Down There".

In the seventies, she hosted talk-back radio on Adelaide AM station 5DN Cruise 1323 with co-host Ken Dickin.

Early ventures into writing included scriptwriting for revues and the controversial "The Mavis Bramston Show".

Her poem, 'To Mourn Too Long for Those We Love' was read at the funeral of former INXS lead singer, Michael Hutchence.

The Thoughts of Nanushka

First published by herself, Nan's "Thoughts" appeared in the 1970s as a single volume, "The Thoughts of Nanushka". A further volume, "The Thoughts of Nanushka Vols VII - XII" appeared in the eighties and a later volume "The Thoughts of Nanushka Vols XIII - XVIII" completed the main three volume set. The same poems have appeared in smaller collections in both hard and paperback, sometimes with different titles, e.g. "Believe in the Dream".

Bibliography
Nanushka's Love Poems: To Someone I Love, Pan, 1992, 
Believe in the Dream: A Selection of Poems from Nanushka, Volumes 1-18, Witcomb, Nan, 1999,

See also

Cruise 1323

References

Sources
Nan Witcomb Up Here and Down There,

External links

 The Thoughts of Nanushka official website
 Nan on Australia's national broadcaster
 Nan on an Ansett memorabilia page

Australian poets
Writers from Adelaide